Ryan Christopher Webb (born February 5, 1986) is an American former professional baseball relief pitcher. He has pitched in Major League Baseball (MLB) for the San Diego Padres, Florida / Miami Marlins, Baltimore Orioles, Cleveland Indians, and Tampa Bay Rays. He is the son of former big leaguer Hank Webb.

Prior to playing professionally, he attended Clearwater Central Catholic High School.

Professional career

Oakland Athletics
Drafted by the Oakland Athletics in the fourth round of the 2004 Major League Baseball draft, Webb began his professional career that year with the AZL Athletics. He went 1-1 with a 4.87 ERA in eight games within the Arizona League. In , he pitched for the Kane County Cougars, going 5-11 with a 4.76 ERA in 24 games and finished third in the Midwest League in losses and fifth in home runs allowed with 16.

San Diego Padres
On July 5, 2009, Webb was traded to the San Diego Padres as part of a trade involving Scott Hairston, and was added to the Major League roster. In 28 games with the Padres, he went 2-1 with a 3.86 ERA and 6 holds, striking out 19 in 25.2 innings. Webb opened 2010 with Triple-A Portland, where he pitched in 8 games before being recalled on May 4 to replace the injured Sean Gallagher. When Gallagher returned on May 28, it was Adam Russell who was optioned. Webb was sent down on August 7, and returned for one game on August 20 before being sent down the next day. He was recalled when the rosters expanded on September 1. In 54 games with San Diego in 2010, he went 3-1 with a 2.90 ERA and 9 holds, striking out 44 in 59 innings.

Florida/Miami Marlins
Following the 2010 season, Webb was traded with Edward Mujica to the Marlins for Cameron Maybin. Webb made the team in 2011 as a middle reliever. In his Marlins debut, he gave up 3 runs in the top of the 10th against the Mets on April 2, earning the loss. In April, he had an 11-game, 12.1 inning scoreless streak. After feeling soreness in his shoulder after an appearance against the Mariners on June 26, Webb was placed on the disabled list on July 2. He returned on August 17, and finished the season with Florida. In 2011, he went 2-4 with a 3.20 ERA and 8 holds, striking out 31 in 50.2 innings.

Webb made the team in 2012. After having a rough June and beginning of July, going 1-1 with an 8.16 ERA in 14.1 innings, he was optioned to Triple-A New Orleans when Edward Mujica returned on July 16. After a 3-game stint with the Zephyrs, he returned to Miami when Logan Morrison was placed on the disabled list on July 29. In 65 games with Miami, he went 4-3 with a 4.03 ERA and 10 holds, striking out 44 in 60.1 innings.

On January 18, 2013, Webb signed a one-year, $975,000 deal with the Marlins to avoid arbitration for the first time. He had a 13-game, 17.1 inning scoreless streak starting on April 23 and ending on May 21. Webb played all of 2013 with Miami, where in a career-high 66 appearances, he went 2-6 with a 2.91 ERA and a career-low 4 holds, striking out 54 in 80.1 innings. Webb fell one appearance short of earning a $10,000 bonus, which came at 67 appearances. After the season, Webb was non-tendered by Miami, becoming a free agent.

Baltimore Orioles
On December 10, 2013, Webb signed a two-year, $4.5 million deal with the Baltimore Orioles. On May 7 Webb picked up his first win in an Orioles jersey pitching in relief against the Tampa Bay Rays. Webb earned his second victory of the season 3 nights later when Steve Clevenger hit a walk-off double after Webb had worked the top of the 10th inning. Despite owning an ERA of 3.80 in 42 games for the O's, Webb was optioned to the minors on August 1.

Los Angeles Dodgers
On April 9, 2015, Webb was traded to the Los Angeles Dodgers (along with minor league catcher Brian Ward and a competitive balance draft pick) in exchange for minor leaguers Ben Rowen and Chris O'Brien. The Dodgers outrighted him to the minors on April 12. He accepted the assignment to AAA but the Dodgers released him the following day, on April 13.

Cleveland Indians
Webb signed a minor league contract with the Cleveland Indians that same day. Webb's contract was purchased by the Indians on April 29, 2015, when he was added to the Indians' active roster.

Tampa Bay Rays

Webb signed a one-year major league contract with the Tampa Bay Rays for the 2016 season. He was designated for assignment on June 27, and released on July 6, 2016.

Chicago White Sox
On July 8, 2016, the White Sox signed Webb to a minor league contract. On July 21, Webb was placed on the disabled list. He was released on August 28, 2016.

Milwaukee Brewers
Webb signed a minor league contract with the Milwaukee Brewers during the 2016-17 offseason. On March 22, 2017, he was released.

San Francisco Giants
On April 5, 2017, the San Francisco Giants signed Webb to a minor league deal to play for the Triple-A Sacramento River Cats. He was released on June 15, 2017.

Chicago Cubs
On June 1, 2018, Webb signed a minor league deal with the Chicago Cubs. He was released on August 10, 2018.

Somerset Patriots
On August 25, 2018, Webb signed with the Somerset Patriots of the Atlantic League of Professional Baseball. He became a free agent following the 2018 season.

Pitching style
Webb is a sinkerballer, throwing his sinker mainly around 93 mph (95 mph in 2011). His secondary pitch is a slider in the mid 80s (his primary off-speed pitch to right-handed hitters), a changeup, also in the mid 80s (his primary off-speed pitch to left-handed hitters), and rarely throwing a four seam fastball at 92 mph.

See also

List of second-generation Major League Baseball players

References

External links

1986 births
Living people
Baseball players from Florida
Sportspeople from Clearwater, Florida
Major League Baseball pitchers
San Diego Padres players
Florida Marlins players
Miami Marlins players
Baltimore Orioles players
Cleveland Indians players
Tampa Bay Rays players
Arizona League Athletics players
Kane County Cougars players
Stockton Ports players
Midland RockHounds players
Sacramento River Cats players
Portland Beavers players
Gulf Coast Marlins players
Jupiter Hammerheads players
New Orleans Zephyrs players
Norfolk Tides players
Columbus Clippers players
Charlotte Stone Crabs players
Durham Bulls players
Charlotte Knights players
Somerset Patriots players